Sundyne is the company’s common name and the brand name for its products and services.
 
Sundyne designs, manufactures and supports industrial pump and compressor products for the process fluid and gas industries. Sundyne’s products serve the worldwide hydrocarbon and chemical processing, pulp and paper, power generation, and the food and beverage markets. Aftermarket services include spare parts, overhaul and repair as well as engineering and technical support. The company’s products include high-speed centrifugal pumps and compressors, seal-less pumps and other process engineered packaging.

Manufacturing facilities 
Arvada, Colorado USA-Headquarters
Dijon, France
Eastbourne, England, United Kingdom
Illescas, Toledo, Spain
Shanghai, China

Employees 

More than 900, approximately 500 located outside of the US.

Customers 

More than 2,000 customer sites in 117 countries.

Pump and compressor technology 
Centrifugal pumps and compressors are defined by the Hydraulic Institute as “a kinetic machine converting mechanical energy into hydraulic energy through centrifugal activity.” Sundyne Pumps also utilize state-of-the-art inducers for low NPSH (Net Positive Suction Head) situations.

Sundyne centrifugal pumps and compressors are traditionally utilized for processes requiring high-head (pumps: 6,300 ft-1,921m)(compressors: 4000psia-350bara), and low-flow (pumps: 1,100gpm or 250m³/hr)(compressors: 10000acfm-17000am³/hr). They are engineered and built to meet the Best Efficiency Point 'BEP' for production processes. Pumps and compressors meet the BEP by engineering specific combinations of speed through integrally geared or direct drives, and custom engineered diffusers and impellers.

Sundyne Sunflo pumps utilize high speed technology to generate high pressure typically for boiler feed, reverse osmosis, NOx suppression, washdown (food and beverage production), injection, seal flush, and condensate return.

Sundyne also has the widest range of sealless magnet drive pumps in the world. HMD Pumps (A Sundyne subsidiary) invented the magnetic drive pump in 1947. The Sundyne sealless magnetic drive pumps are leak-free and ideal for difficult, high value and hazardous fluid processing where containment, reliability and safety are imperative. Sundyne Ansimag sealless magnetic drive pumps are non-metallic and fit ANSI standards. Sundyne HMD/Kontro sealless magnetic drive pumps are metallic with models in ISO, API-610 and API-685 standards.

Sundyne manufactures multistage pumps with a single gear box (HMP Line), horizontal BB series (Marelli), and V series vertical pumps (Marelli). These pumps are utilized for high pressure services in refining, chemical production, fluid storage, and water services.

Sundyne Marelli pumps also include a line of water pumps that are ideal for irrigation, supply, purification, desalination, and general utilities. Sundyne Marelli also produces fire pump systems that meet the industry standards for installation in buildings in Spain and Portugal.

Pump and compressor types and standards manufactured by Sundyne
Sundyne engineered pump and compressor models are compliant with the International Organization for Standardization ISO 13709, and American Petroleum Institute API-610, API-617, API-614, API-685, and ASME/ANSI standards.

Legacy brands 
Sundyne ISO/API Centrifugal Intregrally Geared Process Pumps and Compressors
Sunflo Industrial Grade Integrally Geared Centrifugal Pumps
Ansimag Sealless Magnetic Drive Plastic Lined Pumps
HMD Sealless Magnetic Drive Pumps
Kontro Sealless Magnetic Drive Pumps
Marelli ISO/API Process, Water
PPI Diaphragm Compressors

Industries served 
Refining
Petro Chemical
Water for Municipal, Industry and Agriculture
General Manufacturing Services
Gas Processing
LNG (Liquid Natural Gas)Production
Silicon Manufacturing
Chemical Processing
Power Generation
Oil and Gas Production
Pipeline

Technology and business milestones 

1905—The Rockford Milling Machine Company, owned by Edwin Cedarleaf and brothers Oscar and David Sundstrand, begin operations.
1926—The Sundstrand machine Tool Company is formed through the merger of the Rockford Tool Company and the Rockford milling Machine company.
1933—The Sundstrand Machine Tool Company sells the first oil burner pump. Hydraulic pumps, motors and valves are also developed.
HMD Pumps in England invents and engineers the world's first magnet drive pump.
1957—Sundstrand develops the first water injection pump for the commercial jet aircraft industry. The pump is designed to boost engine thrust during takeoff.
1962—Sundstrand develops the first Sundyne high-speed centrifugal pump and sells it to Shell Chemical.
1965—Sundstrand develops a high-speed process gas compressor and sells it to Union Carbide.
1970—Sundstrand Fluid Handling Division is established in Denver, Colorado. Nikkiso-Sundstrand Fluid Handling Joint Venture is established in Japan and Sundstrand Fluid Handling opens manufacturing plan in Dijon, France. New division manufactures industrial pumps and compressors and other engineered packaging for the hydrocarbon and chemical processing industries.
1994—Sundstrand Fluid Handling acquires Kontro, HMD Sealless Ltd., and SINE Pump.
1998—Sundstrand Fluid Handling acquires ANSIMAG Inc. and MASO Process Pumpen.
1999—United Technologies Corporation acquires Sundstrand Corporation and merges it with its Hamilton Standard division. The new company, Hamilton-Sundstrand, is headquartered in Windsor Locks, Connecticut. Sundstrand Fluid Handling changes its name and logo to Sundyne Corporation under the Hamilton-Sundstrand Industrial Division.
2000—Sundyne acquires Italian manufacturer, Caster Pumps, SRL.
2005—Sundyne sells distribution rights to Sundyne Canned Motor Pumps to Nikkiso Co, LTD
2007—Sundyne buys half of joint venture partner's interest in the joint venture and renames company to Sundyne Nikkiso
2007—eMe Hamilton Sundstrand Electromagnetics Division is moved under Sundyne management.
2008—Hamilton Sundstrand acquires Marelli Pumps in Illescas, Toledo, Spain and places them under Sundyne management.
2009—Sundyne sells MASO/Sine Process Pumps in Ilsfeld, Germany to Watson-Marlow Pump Group.
2010—Sundyne acquires 100% share of Sundyne Nikkiso and renames entity to Sundyne Japan.
2012—Sundyne is sold to a joint venture owned by the Carlyle Group and BC Partners
2020—Sundyne is sold to Warburg Pincus

References

External links 
 Company website

Pump manufacturers